The fifth and final season of the military science fiction television series Stargate Atlantis commenced airing on the Sci Fi Channel in the United States on July 11, 2008, concluded on the same channel on January 9, 2009, and contained 20 episodes. The show itself is a spin off of its sister show, Stargate SG-1. The season upgrades previous supporting characters cast members such as Richard Woolsey (from Stargate SG-1) and Jennifer Keller. Amanda Tapping's character Samantha Carter was downgraded to recurring character in this season. The fifth and final season is about a military-science expedition team fighting against the Wraith from their base of operation, Atlantis. The Wraith primary goal is to gather a fleet to invade Atlantis and find their new "feeding ground", Earth.

The one-hour premiere "Search and Rescue", which aired on July 11, 2008, received 1.3 in Nielsen household ratings, in contrast a "Big" increase from the previous season ratings. The series was developed by Brad Wright and Robert C. Cooper, who also served as executive producers. Season five regular cast members include Joe Flanigan, Rachel Luttrell, Jason Momoa, Jewel Staite, Robert Picardo, and David Hewlett. Stargate Atlantis was originally planned to be continued by a two-hour movie entitled Stargate: Extinction but executive producer Brad Wright has announced that the film has been permanently shelved.

Cast
 Starring Joe Flanigan as Lt. Colonel John Sheppard
 Rachel Luttrell as Teyla Emmagan
 Jason Momoa as Ronon Dex
 Jewel Staite as Dr. Jennifer Keller
 With Robert Picardo as Richard Woolsey
 And David Hewlett as Dr. Rodney McKay

Her character, Colonel Samantha Carter, having been a regular during the previous season, Amanda Tapping became a guest star for several episodes of season five. Robert Picardo joined the permanent cast, with his character, Richard Woolsey, assuming command of Atlantis. Actress Jewel Staite's character, Dr. Jennifer Keller, was also promoted from recurring to regular. Both Michael Shanks (Dr. Daniel Jackson) and Paul McGillion (Dr. Carson Beckett) appeared as guest stars in this season, with McGillion appearing in five episodes. Actress Torri Higginson declined to reprise her role as Dr. Elizabeth Weir in the fifth season. The remainder of the season five regular cast comprised Joe Flanigan, Rachel Luttrell, Jason Momoa, and David Hewlett.

Episodes

Episodes in bold are continuous episodes, where the story spans over 2 or more episodes.

DVD releases

References

External links

 Season 5 on GateWorld
 Season 5 on Syfy
 Season 5 on IMDb
 Season 5 on TV.com
 Season 5 on Epguides
 

.5
2008 American television seasons
2009 American television seasons
Atlantis 05
2008 Canadian television seasons
2009 Canadian television seasons